The 2006 Junior Pan American Artistic Gymnastics Championships was held in Gatineau, Canada, August 25–27, 2006.

Medal summary

Medal table

References

2006 in gymnastics
Pan American Gymnastics Championships
International gymnastics competitions hosted by Canada
2006 in Canadian sports